EDP Lisbon Half Marathon is an annual international half marathon competition which is contested every March in Lisbon, Portugal. It carries IAAF Gold Label Road Race status. The men's course record of 57:31 was set by Jacob Kiplimo in 2021, which is the current world record for the half marathon distance. Kenyan runners have been very successful in the competition, accounting for over half of the total winners, with Tegla Loroupe taking the honours in the women's race on six separate occasions.  The Lisbon Half Marathon is not to be confused with Luso Portugal Half Marathon, another prominent half marathon race which is also held in Lisbon in October.

History

First held in 1991, the race has consistently delivered fast winning times. However, many of these times have been unratifiable for record purposes due to factors including: the course being too short (1991–93), excessive tailwinds, as well as there being an excessive drop in altitude, which boosted athletes' performances (1996, 1998, 2000–01, 2004, and 2006).

The course was judged as non-permissible for records until 2008, in which year the organisers changed the elite course to allow for records. The new course begins at sea level on the north side of the river Tagus, a change which made the course entirely flat. The course for the mass participation race, which has attracted almost 30,000 runners in previous years, remained unchanged and begins by crossing the Ponte 25 de Abril suspension bridge before linking up with the new elite course.

The current elite course of the half marathon begins in a small town on the north bank of the Tagus, no longer crossing the bridge, and the course is wide and flat from there on. Heading eastwards towards the city centre, the course passes the docks and traces a route alongside much of the city's historical architecture, including the Belém Tower and Jerónimos Monastery.

From 2008 onwards, the organisers set aside a €50,000 prize pot for any athlete breaking the world record over the half marathon distance. This led to the participation of a number of prominent athletes, with marathon world record holder Haile Gebrselassie winning the 2008 edition, while Charles Kamathi and Robert Kipkoech Cheruiyot followed behind. Another strong field was assembled in 2010 and Zersenay Tadese of Eritrea broke both the 20 kilometres and half marathon world records in his winning run.

The competition also hosts a mini marathon race, which has featured many prominent Portuguese citizens, including the former President of Portugal Jorge Sampaio, and José Socrates, the Portuguese Prime Minister. Energias de Portugal has sponsored the competition for a number of years.

The 2020 edition of the race was first postponed to 2020.09.06, and then to 2021.05.09, due to the coronavirus pandemic.

Winners

Key:

Statistics

Winners by country

Multiple winners

See also
Lisbon Marathon
Portugal Half Marathon

References

List of winners
Krol, Maarten (2009-03-29). Lisbon International Half Marathon. Association of Road Racing Statisticians. Retrieved on 2010-03-22.

External links 
Official website

Half marathons in Portugal
Spring (season) events in Portugal
Recurring sporting events established in 1991
1991 establishments in Portugal
Sports competitions in Lisbon
Annual events in Lisbon